The 1915 Utah Agricultural Aggies football team was an American football team that represented Utah Agricultural College (later renamed Utah State University) in the Rocky Mountain Conference (RMC) during the 1915 college football season. In their seventh and final season under head coach Clayton Teetzel, the Aggies compiled a 3–4 record (0–3 against RMC opponents), finished eighth in the RMC, and were outscored by a total of 99 to 56.

Schedule

References

Utah Agricultural
Utah State Aggies football seasons
Utah State Aggies football